The FN TPS (Tactical Police Shotgun) is a pump-action shotgun designed and manufactured by FN Herstal. It is based on the Winchester Model 1300 and uses many similar features such as the ported barrel. It also has many modern features including an adjustable or A2 fixed stock, pistol grip, adjustable sights and, MIL-STD-1913 Picatinny rail. The TPS features an M16A2 style front and rear sight. The sights are adjustable for both elevation and windage.

References

External links 
Review
User Manual

FN Herstal firearms
Pump-action shotguns
Shotguns of Belgium